The Medical Marijuana and Cannabidiol Research Expansion Act is an Act of Congress allowing medical research on cannabis. The act is "the first standalone marijuana-related bill approved by both chambers of the United States Congress".

History
The bill was introduced in the Senate February 4, 2021 by Senators Dianne Feinstein (D) of California, Brian Schatz (D) of Hawaii, and Chuck Grassley (R) of Iowa as S.253; it was forwarded unanimously by the Senate Committee on the Judiciary and passed by Senate unanimously on March 24, 2022. A new bill with minor changes was introduced in House on July 21, 2022, by four Republicans and two Democrats; Rep. Earl Blumenauer of Oregon was the lead sponsor. It was passed by House under suspension of the rules 395-25 five days later. On November 16, 2022, the Senate passed the House bill by voice vote and sent it to the President to be signed into law. President Biden signed the bill into law on December 2, 2022.

Provisions
The act requires the Drug Enforcement Administration to register researchers and suppliers of cannabis for medical research in a timely manner, who will then be able to legally manufacture, distribute, dispense and possess the substance. It also creates a mechanism for FDA approval of drugs derived from the cannabis plant and "[p]rotects doctors who may now discuss the harms and benefits of using cannabis and cannabis derivatives." It also requires the Department of Health and Human Services to investigate the medical utility of cannabis and barriers that exist to conducting research, and requires the Attorney General to conduct an annual review to ensure that cannabis is being adequately produced for research purposes.

See also
List of 2022 United States cannabis reform proposals
Cannabis policy of the Joe Biden administration

Notes

References

Further reading

External links
 Medical Marijuana and Cannabidiol Research Expansion Act (PDF/details) as enacted in the US Statutes at Large
H.R.8454 - Medical Marijuana and Cannabidiol Research Expansion Act on Congress.gov

2022 cannabis law reform
Acts of the 117th United States Congress
United States federal controlled substances legislation